Norma De Saint Picman is a' Franco Slovenian artist who has created a project called Noravisionsolar, which aims to address the problem of waste and environmental harm caused by the production and disposal of solar panels. These panels contain toxic materials such as lead and cadmium, and most of them end up in landfills because recycling is more expensive than the economic value of the materials.
De Saint Picman's project seeks to extend the lifespan of solar panels and to recycle them creatively, for example by turning them into works of art. As part of this project, De Saint Picman has painted solar panels using a variety of techniques, including acrylic paints and the principles of plein air and impressionism.
She has also collaborated with a solar panel manufacturer Bisol in Slovenia to create physical artworks on solar panels, which she has then protected with a special varnish. 
These artworks can be installed in public spaces such as subway, tunnels and airports, and have the potential to create revenue for artists, gallerists, auction houses, and curators through the Noravision Decentralised Arts ecosystem. 
De Saint Picman has also worked with Suncontract's CEO, Gregor Novak, and a solar panel Blockchain Lady, installed in the company's new business premises used is created using sandblasting techniques. 
Finally, De Saint Picman has used photographs taken by her friend, the Venetian artist and designer Ana Maria Reque, as inspiration for her paintings on solar panels, which depict the motifs of Venice and address the issue of climate change.
From 2018 up to now, she has painted sixty panels, and presented them internationally in exhibition series,  such as Contemporary Venice , 2019, Luce dell Eterno  2020,  Artes Dei, Metamorphoses – The Worlds of Change , 2021, Noravisionsolar The Garden of Eden2021, Between Night and Day, 2022. Noravisionsolar project expanded further into Noravisionsolarmetaverse with different presentations in virtual galleries and NFT.

References

Slovenian artists
Year of birth missing (living people)
Living people
French sculptors
 postmodern artists